The Chorniava is a  long left tributary of the river Prut in western Ukraine. Its source is near the village of Zhukotyn (Kolomyia Raion), Ukraine. It flows through the villages and towns Zhukiv, Obertyn, Yakivka, Vynohrad, Hvizdets, Balyntsi and Kelykhiv. It discharges into the Prut near the village of Vovchkivtsi (Kolomyia Raion).

References

Rivers of Ivano-Frankivsk Oblast
Tributaries of the Prut